Cyperus glaber is a species of sedge that is native to parts of central and eastern Europe, the Middle East and western Asia.

See also 
 List of Cyperus species

References 

glaber
Plants described in 1771
Flora of Iran
Flora of Iraq
Flora of Afghanistan
Flora of Albania
Flora of Bulgaria
Flora of Cyprus
Flora of Greece
Flora of Italy
Flora of Hungary
Flora of Syria
Flora of Lebanon
Flora of Pakistan
Flora of Israel
Flora of Romania
Flora of Turkey
Flora of Ukraine
Flora of Uzbekistan
Taxa named by Carl Linnaeus